Legarda may refer to:

People
 Legarda (singer), Colombian singer and internet personality
 Benito Legarda (1853-1915), Filipino legislator
 Bernardo de Legarda ( – 1773), Ecuadorian sculptor and painter
 Katrina Legarda (active from 1975), Filipino lawyer
 Loren Legarda (born 1960), Filipino environmentalist, cultural worker, journalist, and politician
 Trinidad Legarda (1899-1998), Filipina suffragist, clubwoman, philanthropist, and editor

Other uses
 Legarda, Navarre, a town and municipality located in the province and autonomous community of Navarre, northern Spain
 Legarda, Poland, a village in the administrative district of Gmina Gostynin, Gostynin County, Masovian Voivodeship, in east-central Poland
 Legarda Elementary School, a public elementary school located in Sampaloc in the City of Manila
 Legarda station, a station on the Manila Line 2
 Legarda Street, Sampaloc district in Manila, Philippines

See also
 Legarda Ancestral House, San Miguel, Manila, Philippines